Epimolis affinis is a moth of the family Erebidae. It was described by Walter Rothschild in 1909. It is found in French Guiana, Venezuela and Peru.

References

Phaegopterina
Moths described in 1909